Chapter Three: Yellow (stylized in all lowercase) is the fourth extended play (EP) by the American singer Bea Miller. It was released on October 6, 2017, by Hollywood Records. The EP is the third and final part of a trilogy of EPs, following the release of the first two chapters, Chapter One: Blue and Chapter Two: Red. It is the last of Miller's releases before the release of her second studio album, Aurora, on February 23, 2018, which consist of all the songs from the three chapters and also five new songs. Miller has described the EP as "It's like you’ve made it out of this situation, and you've gotten past one hurdle in your life, and it's kind of like, 'Okay, I've gotten through one thing, and now I'm ready to face the next'".

Track listing

Notes
"Repercussions" and "To the Grave" are stylized in all lowercase letters.
 signifies a co-producer

Personnel 
Credits adapted from Qobuz.

Bea Miller – lead vocals, composer, songwriter
Mike Stud – featured artist, songwriter
Jesse Shatkin – recording engineer, programmer, composer, producer, songwriter
Alex Spencer – assistant recording engineer
Keith Sorrels – assistant recording engineer
Todd Norman – assistant recording engineer
Trevor "Trevorious" Brown – composer, co-producer, songwriter
Warren "Oak" Felder – composer, engineer, producer, songwriter
Julia Michaels – composer, songwriter
Justin Tranter – composer, songwriter
Steph Jones – songwriter, background vocals
Ido Zmishlany – composer, engineer, producer, songwriter
Zaire Koalo – co-production
Erik Madrid – mixing
James Royo – mixing

References

Bea Miller albums
2017 EPs
Albums produced by Oak Felder